Yau Tong is a station on the Hong Kong MTR  and the . It is the only station of the Tseung Kwan O line located in Kowloon. The livery of the station is yellow. Although the train platforms are constructed above ground level, they are sealed from the outside with concrete walls to prevent the noise of trains from disturbing the nearby residents of Yau Tong Estate.

History 

This resulted in complaints from passengers because the new arrangement forced them to change trains twice when crossing the Victoria Harbour.

The station opened on 4 August 2002 so that passengers could interchange between the two lines. The new station made travel times between Lam Tin and  four minutes longer.

The station was built without public toilets, like most other MTR stations at the time. New toilets and a babycare room were commissioned at the station on 29 May 2019.

Station layout 

Yau Tong station has three main levels: the concourse, the upper platforms, and the lower platforms.

The upper platform level consists of Platforms 2 and 3. Passengers crossing the harbour on the Tseung Kwan O line towards the Kowloon side can cross over to Platform 2 to change to the Kwun Tong line to get to most destinations in East Kowloon.

The lower platform level contains Platforms 1 and 4. Passengers travelling on the Kwun Tong line travelling towards Tiu Keng Leng can cross over to Platform 4 to change to the Tseung Kwan O line to cross the harbour to North Point.

Entrances and exits 

A1: Yau Tong Estate, Domain, Lei Yue Mun Plaza, Lei Yue Mun Estate, Tseung Kwan O Chinese Permanent Cemetery, public transport interchange 
A2: Lei Yue Mun Municipal Services Building, Jockey Club Lei Yue Mun Plus
B1: Yau Lai Estate, St. Antonius Primary School 
B2: Cha Kwo Ling Road

Nearby facilities 

A new shopping centre, Domain, opened on 29 September 2012. It was the second shopping mall in Yau Tong. The first one was Lei Yue Mun Plaza, which opened in 2001. On 2 July 2012, Yau Tong Public Transport Interchange was opened; bus and public light bus routes serving the previous Yau Tong Station Temporary Bus Terminus were moved to the new location. The transport interchange can be accessed via exit A2.

References 

MTR stations in Kowloon
Kwun Tong line
Tseung Kwan O line
Yau Tong
Railway stations in Hong Kong opened in 2002